Clifton Park, NY, Vol. 2 is the sixth studio album and second part of the Clifton Park, NY double album by Desmadrados Soldados de Ventura, released on 9 July 2015  by Golden Lab Records. In writing for The Wire, Edwin Pouncey noted that "the tough Mancunian edge to the playing [...] reveals its true source on Vol 2, an almost industrial attack that is the abrasive obverse  of Vol 1's easy gliding approach"

Track listing

Personnel
Adapted from the Clifton Park, NY, Vol. 2 liner notes.

Desmadrados Soldados de Ventura
 David Birchall – electric guitar
 Andrew Cheetham – drums
 Mike Griffin – electric guitar
 Eric Hardiman – electric guitar
 Dylan Hughes – electric guitar
 Nick Mitchell – electric guitar
 Edwin Stevens – electric guitar
 Otto Willberg – bass guitar

Production and additional personnel
 John Moloney – cover art, illustrations

Release history

References

External links 
 Clifton Park, NY, Vol. 2 at Bandcamp

2015 albums
Desmadrados Soldados de Ventura albums
Instrumental albums